Kurahashi may refer to:

Places
Kurahashi-jima, an island of Hiroshima Prefecture, Japan
Kurahashi, Hiroshima, a former town in Aki District, Hiroshima Prefecture, Japan

Other uses
Kurahashi (surname), a Japanese surname
Kurahashi Station, a railway station in Asahi, Chiba Prefecture, Japan